Naumule is a rural municipality in Dailekh district of Nepal

Naumule may also refer to:
 Naumule (village), a village of Dailekh district of Nepal